Żurawieniec may refer to the following places:
Żurawieniec, Greater Poland Voivodeship (west-central Poland)
Żurawieniec, Kutno County in Łódź Voivodeship (central Poland)
Żurawieniec, Pabianice County in Łódź Voivodeship (central Poland)